Kay Wilson (born 19 September 1991) is an English rugby union player for . She was included in the 2014 and 2017 Women's Rugby World Cup's.

Career
Wilson was born in 1991 and she was playing at the age of five and she played for Old Caterhamians, Warlingham and Dorking whilst a child. She attended Saint Bede's Secondary School in Redhill, Surrey.

She graduated with a degree in Sports Development from the Cardiff Metropolitan University. Wilson also played for the Cardiff Met's Ladies RFC.

Wilson made her debut at the 2011 IRB Nations Cup.

She is a winger and in March 2017 she scored seven tries against Scotland during a 64–0 win by England in the Six Nations at Twickenham. This contributed to her position as top scorer in the Six Nations that year.

References

External links
RFU Player Profile

1991 births
Living people
England women's international rugby union players
English female rugby union players
England international women's rugby sevens players